Zhitnoye is a rural locality (a selo) and the administrative center of Zhitninsky Selsoviet of Ikryaninsky District, Astrakhan Oblast, Russia. The population was 1,902 as of 2010. There are 29 streets.

Geography 
Zhitnoye is located 42 km south of Ikryanoye (the district's administrative centre) by road. Mumra is the nearest rural locality.

References 

Rural localities in Ikryaninsky District